Northleigh is a village and civil parish in the East Devon district of Devon, England.

The church of St Giles was built in the Perpendicular style and has a western tower. Features of interest are the plain Norman south doorway, two screens – one to the chancel and one to the north chancel chapel – and the Jacobean pulpit. It is a Grade II* listed building.

References

External links

Villages in Devon
East Devon District